Noël St. Clair Deschamps (25 December 190812 May 2005) was an Australian public servant and diplomat.

Early life and education

Deschamps was born in Brisbane, the son of Jacqueline Hester née Irwin and Joseph Mark Deschamps. His paternal grandparents owned a vineyard.  He was educated at Glamorgan Preparatory School in Toorak, Melbourne. He graduated with a Master of Arts from the University of Cambridge and spent a couple of years as a school-master in North Wales before returning to Australia.

Diplomatic career

Deschamps joined the Department of External Affairs in 1937. January 1940 saw Deschamps appointed official secretary to the Australian High Commissioner in Canada.

Between 1946 and 1947 Deschamps was Charge d'Affaires in Moscow. While in Moscow his sister Yvonne visited.

In March 1950 Deschamps presented his credentials as the head of the Australian Military Mission in Berlin to the three Allied High Commissioners at Bonn. In January 1952, Deschamps was appointed Charge d'Affaires in West Germany to open up the Australian embassy in Bonn.

While Australian Ambassador to Cambodia (1962–1969) Deschamps also represented the interests of the United States in the country after King Norodom Sihanouk broke off diplomatic ties with Washington. Deschamps became a friend of Sihanouk's and the Ambassador was awarded a high Cambodian decoration to mark the close relationship between Australia and Cambodia.

In January 1969 Deschamps was appointed Ambassador to Chile. He presented his credentials to President Eduardo Frei Montalva on 4 June 1969. Deschamps was recalled to Australia for consultations shortly after a coup to remove the Allende Government. He did not return to the country in an official capacity after the coup with the Australian Government instead appointing a charge d'affaires.

Deschamps retired in December 1973 to Melbourne.

Later life

In his retirement, Deschamps was a patron of the Monarchist League.

In May 2005, Deschamps died in Melbourne, aged 96.

References

1908 births
2005 deaths
Australian monarchists
Consuls-General of Australia in Noumea
Ambassadors of Australia to Chile
Ambassadors of Australia to Cambodia
Ambassadors of Australia to Ireland
Ambassadors of Australia to the Soviet Union